Brain and Creativity Institute (BCI) is a research unit of the College of Letters, Arts and Sciences at the University of Southern California, which aims to "gather new knowledge about the human emotions, decision-making, memory, and communication, from a neurological perspective, and to apply this knowledge to the solution of problems in the biomedical and sociocultural arenas." The Institute was founded in August 2006, when Antonio Damasio, Hanna Damasio and colleagues moved from the University of Iowa to the University of Southern California.

External links 
 BCI website
 Damasio's homepage within BCI
 Damasio's homepage within USC Neuroscience
 Damasio's homepage within USC Psychology

Institutes of the University of Southern California
Neuroscience research centers in California